The Secret of the Whistler is a 1946 American mystery film noir based on the radio drama The Whistler. Directed by George Sherman, the production features Richard Dix, Leslie Brooks and Michael Duane. It is the sixth of Columbia Pictures' eight "Whistler" films produced in the 1940s, all but the last starring Dix.

Plot
Ralph Harrison (Richard Dix) is married to Edith (Mary Currier), a rich woman who has been suffering heart attacks. Upset by her condition, he finds consoling companionship with an artist's model, the unscrupulous gold-digger Kay (Leslie Brooks).

He falls in love with Kay. Edith's health then improves. Edith overhears Ralph professing his love for Kay. Edith threatens Ralph, saying she's going to take him out of her will. He decides to poison her, with her own medicine, before she can meet with her lawyers.

After Edith dies, Ralph marries Kay, who becomes suspicious of how Edith died and worried for her own fate. Finding incriminating diary pages and the medicine, she has the medicine analyzed, discovering that it was poisoned.

Ralph overhears the phone conversation with the lab. Pretending to embrace her, he strangles Kay to death, just as the police arrive and arrest him for murder — a murder he didn't need to commit because Edith hadn't taken the poisoned medicine after all, but died of a heart attack, before she could take it.

Cast
 Richard Dix as Ralph Harrison
 Leslie Brooks as Kay Morrell
 Michael Duane as Artist Jim Calhoun
 Mary Currier as Edith Marie Harrison
 Mona Barrie as Linda Vail
 Ray Walker as Joseph Aloysius 'Joe' Conroy
 Claire Du Brey as Laura - Harrison's Servant
 Otto Forrest as The Whistler

Reception
TV Guide rated it 3/5 stars and called it "engrossing as usual and well acted".

References

External links
 
 
 
 

1946 films
1946 mystery films
American mystery films
1940s English-language films
American black-and-white films
Film noir
Columbia Pictures films
Films based on radio series
Films directed by George Sherman
Films scored by Herschel Burke Gilbert
The Whistler films
1940s American films